Bryconexodon juruenae is a species of characins endemic to Brazil. 
It is found in the upper Tapajós River basin in Brazil.

References

Oyakawa, O.T., 1998. Catalogo dos tipos de peixes recentes do Museu de Zoologia da USP. I. Characiformes (Teleostei: Ostariophysi). Pap. Avuls. Zool. 39(23):443-507.

Characidae
Fish of Brazil
Endemic fauna of Brazil
Taxa named by Jacques Géry
Fish described in 1980